Beriohansa is a monotypic moth genus of the family Noctuidae described by Nye in 1975. Its only species, Beriohansa hansali, was first described by Felder in 1874. It is found in Ethiopia.

References

Catocalinae
Monotypic moth genera